Rep, rip, repp, or reps is a cloth woven in fine cords or ribs across the width of a piece, usually made of silk, wool, or cotton. The name is said to have been adapted from the French reps, a word of unknown origin; it has also been suggested that it is a corruption of rib. In silk it is used for dresses, neckties, and to some extent, for ecclesiastical vestments. In wool and cotton it is used for various upholstery purposes.

See also
Repp tie

References

Woven fabrics